Rocci is an Italian surname. Notable people with the surname include:

 Benedetto Rocci (died 1661), Italian Roman Catholic prelate who served as Bishop of Nusco
 Ciriaco Rocci (1582–1651), Italian Catholic Cardinal and papal Apostolic Nuncio to Switzerland and Holy Roman Empire
 Scipione Riva-Rocci (1863–1937), Italian internist, pathologist and pediatrician

Italian-language surnames